Charles David Minsky is an American cinematographer. He is best known for his collaborations with film director Garry Marshall,  their collaborations include Pretty Woman, Dear God, Raising Helen, The Princess Diaries 2: Royal Engagement, New Year's Eve and Mother's Day.

Filmography
Radioactive Dreams (1985)
April Fool's Day (1986)
Weekend Warriors (1986)
Pretty Woman (1990)
Dutch (1991)
The Gun in Betty Lou's Handbag (1992)
Past Tense (TV) (1994)
Kazaam (1996)
Dear God (1996)
Guinevere (1999)
Looking for an Echo (2000)
Tomcats (2001)
Slap Her... She's French (2002)
Welcome to Collinwood (2002)
Raising Helen (2004)
The Princess Diaries 2: Royal Engagement (2004)
The Producers (2005)
Keeping Up with the Steins (2006)
You, Me and Dupree (2006)
The Russell Girl (TV) (2008)
Post Grad (2009)
Loving Leah (TV) (2009)
New Year's Eve (2011)
Something Borrowed (2011)
Mother's Day (2016)
Adventures in Babysitting (TV) (2016)

References

Living people
American cinematographers
Year of birth missing (living people)